Louis Perez (born 11 June 1997) is a French footballer who plays as a midfielder for North Carolina FC in USL League One.

Career

Youth
Perez spent time with various teams in France, including CO Vincennes, Paris Saint-Germain, AS Poissy and ESTAC Troyes, the latter of which he appeared for the club's second team in the CFA.

College
In 2017, Perez moved to the United States to play college soccer at the University of Central Florida. In three seasons with the Golden Knights, Perez made 50 appearances, scoring 7 goals and tallying 16 assists. In 2019, his last full season for UCF before the COVID-19 pandemic saw the 2020 season cancelled, Perez was the team's second-leading scorer with four goals and 11 assists, which was one-off a school single-season record. Perez's 11 assists were fourth in the NCAA and led Perez to be named as second-team All-American Athletic Conference. In 2018, Perez was named the AAC Midfielder of the Year and a third-team All-American by the United Soccer Coaches, helping UCF to the AAC regular-season title.

Professional
On 17 February 2021, Perez signed his first professional contract, joining USL Championship side Pittsburgh Riverhounds. Perez made his professional debut on May 8, 2021, appearing as a 61st-minute substitute in a 3–0 loss to Tampa Bay Rowdies.

On 3 February 2022, Perez made the move to USL League One side FC Tucson.

Following Tucson's voluntary relegation to USL League Two, Perez signed with USL League One club North Carolina FC.

References

External links

UCF profile
Riverhounds profile

1997 births
Association football midfielders
Championnat National 2 players
Expatriate soccer players in the United States
French footballers
French expatriate footballers
French expatriate sportspeople in the United States
Living people
North Carolina FC players
Pittsburgh Riverhounds SC players
Footballers from Paris
ES Troyes AC players
FC Tucson players
UCF Knights men's soccer players
USL Championship players